Dalroy is a hamlet in southern Alberta under the jurisdiction of Rocky View County.  It is located approximately 28 km (18 mi) east of Downtown Calgary and 0.8 km (0.5 mi) east of Highway 9.

This name 'Dalroy' is a combination of the names Dill & McElroy who were Dalroy's first local merchants.

Demographics 

The population of Dalroy according to the 2018 municipal census conducted by Rocky View County is 46.

See also 
List of communities in Alberta
List of hamlets in Alberta

References 

Karamitsanis, Aphrodite (1992). Place Names of Alberta – Volume II, Southern Alberta, University of Calgary Press, Calgary, Alberta.
Read, Tracey (1983). Acres and Empires – A History of the Municipal District of Rocky View, Calgary, Alberta.

Calgary Region
Designated places in Alberta
Hamlets in Alberta
Rocky View County